Toljen (fl. 1189) was a Serbian prince (knez), who ruled Hum between 1192–1196, serving his uncle Serbian Grand Prince Stefan Nemanja (r. 1166–1196).

Life
His father was Miroslav of Hum (r. 1166–1190; 1192) and his mother was a sister of Ban Kulin of Bosnia. Miroslav had ruled Hum under nominal rule of his brother, Stefan Nemanja.

In order to secure Serbian-German relations, during the talks between Stefan Nemanja and Frederic Barbarossa during his passing through Serbia during the Third Crusade, it was arranged that Toljen was betrothed (between 27 Jul 1189 and 24 Apr 1190) to the daughter of Berthold IV, "Duke of Merano Marchese di Istria" and his wife Agnes von Wettin. Berthold IV, who was in Barbarossa's entourage at Niš, had an important part in the Serbian-German talks. It was also decided that knez Toljen would succeed his father before any of his brothers. Toljen was to await his spouse at Istria on the feast day of St. George the following year. In ca. 1190, Stefan Nemanja briefly assigned the rule of Hum to his son Rastko Nemanjić, meanwhile Miroslav held the Lim region with Bijelo Polje. Rastko however took monastic vows and Miroslav continued ruling Hum or parts of it after 1192. Miroslav died of old age in 1198.

Family
Together they had one son, Toljen II, who succeeded as Prince later in 1227-1239.

Annotations

References

Sources

Конст. Јиречек: Тољен син кнеза Мир о слава хумског. Српска кр. А кадемија. Глас ХХХV. 1892

12th-century Serbian royalty
Vukanović dynasty